Hessea is a genus of bulb-forming plants in the Amaryllis family native to Namibia and South Africa. The genus name commemorates C. H. F. Hesse  (1772–1832), who resided in Cape Town from 1800 to 1817.

Species

formerly included
Several species have been coined using the name Hessea, which refer to species now considered better suited to genera Namaquanula, Nerine or Strumaria:

References

Flora of Southern Africa
Amaryllidaceae genera